Usishchevo is a rural locality (a village) in Myaksinskoye Rural Settlement, Cherepovetsky District, Vologda Oblast, Russia. The population was 32 as of 2002.

Geography 
Usishchevo is located 31 km southeast of Cherepovets (the district's administrative centre) by road. Kostyayevo is the nearest rural locality.

References 

Rural localities in Cherepovetsky District